The United Front was a coalition government of 13 political parties formed in India after the 1996 general elections. The coalition formed two governments in India between 1996 and 1998. The government was headed by two Prime Ministers from Janata Dal – H. D. Deve Gowda, and I. K. Gujral. N. Chandrababu Naidu of the Telugu Desam Party served as the convener of United Front. Headquartered at the Andhra Pradesh Bhavan at New Delhi.

Background
The Indian general election in 1996 returned a fractured verdict. With the Bharatiya Janata Party (BJP) emerging as the largest party, with 161 of 543 seats, it was invited first to form a government. It accepted the offer, and Atal Bihari Vajpayee was sworn in as prime minister. However, he was unable to muster a majority on the floor of the house, and the government fell 13 days later. At a meeting of all the other parties, the Indian National Congress, with a substantial 140 seats, declined to head the government and agreed to extend outside support to the coalition. Whereas Communist Party of India (Marxist), agreed to join the coalition with the Janata Dal at its head, named the "United Front". Other members of the front included the Samajwadi Party, Dravida Munnetra Kazhagam, Asom Gana Parishad, Tamil Maanila Congress, Communist Party of India and Telugu Desam Party.

With the approval of the Congress and CPI(M), the sitting Chief Minister of Karnataka, H. D. Deve Gowda, was asked to head the coalition as Prime Minister after V. P. Singh and Jyoti Basu declined. His term was from June 1, 1996 – April 21, 1997. The Congress revoked its support to Gowda amidst discontent over communication between the coalition and the Congress. It compromised to support a new government under I. K. Gujral, who was Prime Minister from April 21, 1997 – March 19, 1998. Following the collapse of his government, fresh elections were called, and the United Front lost power.
Later with the exit of N. Chandrababu Naidu as the convener of UF to extend outside support to NDA, United Front collapsed.

Electoral performance

List of prime ministers

Coalition members

References

Political parties in India
Coalition governments of India
Gowda administration
Gujral administration
1996 establishments in India
Political parties established in 1996